Steven R. Cummings is an American epidemiologist and Emeritus Professor of Medicine, Epidemiology and Biostatistics at the University of California San Francisco.
He is one of the top highly cited researchers (h>100) according to webometrics.

References 

Date of birth missing (living people)
Living people
American epidemiologists
University of California, San Francisco faculty
Year of birth missing (living people)